Li Baozhen (733–794), né An Baozhen, courtesy name Taixuan, formally the Prince of Yiyang, was a general of the Chinese Tang Dynasty.  He initially distinguished himself as deputy for his cousin Li Baoyu, and after Li Baoyu's death came into command of his own. He played substantial roles in fighting the rebellions during Emperor Dezong's reign against Zhu Tao, Wang Wujun, Tian Yue, and Li Na; and later in persuading Wang, Tian, and Li to again submit to Emperor Dezong.

Background 
An Baozhen was born in 733, during the reign of Emperor Xuanzong.  He was probably the 10th-born son. His family was originally from Parthia but had lived for generations in the Hexi region, and his great-grandfather An Xiuren was a contributor to Tang Dynasty's establishment, having assisted his brother An Xinggui in overthrowing one of the contenders for supremacy during the transition from Sui to Tang, Li Gui the Emperor of Liang and united Li Gui's Liang state to Tang. The An family was known for its capability in tending horses, and a number of An family members moved to the region around the Tang capital Chang'an and became students of literature, having intermarried with scholar-bureaucratic families.  It was said that An Baozhen was a deep thinker yet decisive.  He later served under his third cousin An Baoyu (a great-grandson of An Xinggui's).  In 757, during the Anshi Rebellion, An Baoyu requested a surname change because he did not want to share a surname with the rebel Yan state's emperor An Lushan.  Emperor Xuanzong's son and successor Emperor Suzong agreed and bestowed the imperial surname of Li on An Baoyu.  Presumably, An Baozhen's surname was also changed to Li at the time, as Emperor Suzong also permitted the entire clan to have its designated home changed to the capital Chang'an at the time.

During Emperor Daizong's reign 
After Emperor Suzong died in 762 and was succeeded by his son Emperor Daizong, Li Baoyu, who already had a command as a military governor (Jiedushi), was given the additional command of Zelu Circuit (澤潞, headquartered in modern Changzhi, Shanxi), and it was said that he valued Li Baozhen's service under him.  At one point, Li Baozhen was made the secretary general of Fen Prefecture (汾州, in modern Linfen, Shanxi), when it appeared that the general Pugu Huai'en, who controlled the region and commanded the powerful army of Shuofang Circuit (朔方, headquartered in modern Yinchuan, Ningxia), was set on rebelling against Emperor Daizong. Li Baozhen slipped away in 764 and fled back to Chang'an.  When Emperor Daizong asked him for his opinions on what to do with Pugu, Li Baozhen suggested that Emperor Daizong recommission the general Guo Ziyi, who was formerly Pugu's superior as the commander of the Shuofang army, arguing that such a move would undermine the morale of Pugu's army. Emperor Daizong agreed, and subsequently, Pugu did rebel but was unsuccessful.  Emperor Daizong, crediting Li Baozhen for his opinions, made him the deputy military governor of both Zelu and Chenzheng (陳鄭, headquartered in modern Zhengzhou, Henan) Circuits, both of which were then under Li Baoyu's command.  When Li Baozhen met Emperor Daizong to thank him, Li Baozhen, while thanking Emperor Daizong, stated, "Whether the people have to labor or can rest depends on their prefect.  I would like to receive a prefecture to try myself."  Emperor Daizong approved of his volunteering, and, in addition to making him the deputy military governor of Zelu and Chenzheng, also made him the prefect of Ze Prefecture (澤州, in modern Jincheng, Shanxi), one of the prefectures of Zelu Circuit.  He served at Ze Prefecture for two years and then was moved to Huai Prefecture (懷州, in modern Jiaozuo, Henan), which was merged into Zelu.  He served there for eight years.  At that time, as Li Baoyu was at Fengxiang (鳳翔, in modern Baoji, Shaanxi) on the western border with Tufan, Li Baozhen was in effective command of Zelu.

Li Baozhen believed that, eventually, there would be war against a number of circuits commanded by generals who nominally submitted to Tang authority—Pinglu (平盧, headquartered in modern Weifang, Shandong), Lulong (盧龍, headquartered in modern Beijing), Weibo (魏博, headquartered in modern Handan, Hebei), Chengde (成德, headquartered in modern Shijiazhuang, Hebei), Zhaoyi (昭義, headquartered in modern Anyang, Henan), and Shannan East (山南東道, headquartered in modern Xiangfan, Hubei), believed that Zelu was in a strategic position and was vulnerable to attack.  In the aftermaths of the Anshi Rebellion, however, the circuit was lacking in military manpower, and had no financial resources to recruit soldiers.  He thus created an innovative program—he selected the strongest of farmers and waived their tax burdens; in exchange, they were to train in archery, and the most capable ones would receive rewards.  In three years, he was able to train them sufficiently that he was then able to convert them to an army of 20,000 men.  It was said at the time that no other infantry in the realm could rival Zelu's.  In 776, after Zhaoyi Circuit was largely seized by Tian Chengsi, the military governor of Weibo Circuit, after the death of its military governor Xue Song, and after the succeeding military governor of the portion of Zhaoyi that came under imperial control, Li Chengzhao, fell ill, Li Baozhen was given the deputy military governorship of Zhaoyi as well, and Zhaoyi and Zelu were merged.  In 777, after Li Baoyu died, Li Baozhen continued to be in command of the merged Zhaoyi Circuit, but still carried the title of deputy military governor.

During Emperor Dezong's reign 
Emperor Daizong died in 779 and was succeeded by his son Emperor Dezong.  In 780, Emperor Dezong officially made Li Baozhen the military governor of Zhaoyi.  In 781, when Emperor Dezong, wanting to reassert imperial authority, refused to allow Li Weiyue to succeed his father Li Baochen as the military governor of Chengde or Li Na to succeed his father Li Zhengji as the military governor of Pinglu, Li Weiyue, Li Na, and Tian Yue the military governor of Weibo rose together against imperial forces. As a part of their operations, Tian attacked Linming (臨洺, in modern Handan), then defended by the Zhaoyi general Zhang Pi. Li Baozhen sought aid from the imperial government, and Emperor Daizong sent the general Ma Sui the military governor of Hedong Circuit (河東, headquartered in modern Taiyuan, Shanxi) as well as a commanding general of the imperial Shence Army, Li Sheng, to aid Li Baozhen.  Together, Ma, Li Baozhen, and Li Sheng defeated Tian at Linming, forcing him to flee back to his headquarters at Wei Prefecture.  In spring 782, they, along with Li Qiu the military governor of Heyang Circuit (headquartered in modern Jiaozuo, Henan) again defeated Tian (who was then aided by forces from Pinglu and Chengde as well) at Huan River (洹水, flowing through modern Handan).  It was said that, in the aftermaths of the battle, Tian's subordinate Li Changshun was ready to surrender Wei Prefecture to imperial forces, but as Ma and Li Baozhen did not get along with each other, their progressed was slowed, and only after 10 days after Tian was able to flee back to Wei Prefecture and kill Li Changchun did the imperial forces arrive at Wei Prefecture, and they were unable to capture it.  (Ma and Li Baozhen's grudge against each other had originated when Ma was the defender of Heyang; at that time, there was an occasion when Li Baozhen wanted to kill his subordinate Yang Shu the prefect of Huai Prefecture; Yang fled to Ma, who not only allowed him to take refuge but further submitted a petition to the emperor to defend Yang.)

Later in the year, when Li Weiyue's subordinate Wang Wujun rose against Li Weiyue and killed him, Wang briefly submitted to imperial authorities, but then rebelled when he was not made the military governor of Chengde as Emperor Dezong had implicitly promised.  (Emperor Dezong had promised that whoever killed Li Weiyue would receive the positions that Li Weiyue wanted—but instead divided Chengde into three circuits, giving Wang the command of Hengji Circuit (恆冀, headquartered in modern Shijiazhuang at the old Chengde headquarters in Heng Prefecture), containing only two prefectures of the seven Chengde prefectures, with the lesser title of military prefect (團練使, Tuanlianshi), while giving three prefectures to Zhang Xiaozhong, who was made military governor of Yiwu Circuit (義武, headquartered in modern Baoding, Hebei) and two prefectures to Kang Rizhi as the military prefect of Shenzhao Circuit (深趙, headquartered in modern Shijiazhuang).)  When Wang rose, he attacked Kang's position at Zhao Prefecture.  The Ma-Li Baozhen dispute then almost nearly broke into the open when Li Baozhen sent part of his army to defend part of his territory, Xing Prefecture (邢州, in modern Xingtai, Hebei), which neighbored Zhao Prefecture; this displeased Ma, and Ma considered withdrawing altogether.  Only at the moderation of Li Sheng did Ma and Li Baozhen make peace, and Ma's subsequent recommendation, Ming Prefecture (洺州, in modern Handan) was added to Zhaoyi.  Subsequently, when Zhu Tao, the deputy military governor of Lulong—who had been loyal to imperial authority earlier but who had turned against the imperial government after not given any part of Chengde after Li Weiyue's death—came to Tian's aid along with Wang, the imperial forces suffered a major defeat.  They had to take up defensive position and were no longer able to threaten Wei Prefecture.  Subsequently, the four rebels declared themselves princes—Zhu declaring himself the Prince of Ji, Wang declaring himself the Prince of Zhao, Tian declaring himself the Prince of Wei, and Li Na declaring himself the Prince of Qi—effectively declaring independence, although they continued to use Tang's era name in order to show nominal allegiance.  Soon, however, Zhu and Wang had a dispute over Zhu's actions in not returning quickly to Wei Prefecture after he briefly went back to his own circuit to fight off a surprise joint attack by Li Sheng and Zhang Shengyun (張昇雲, Zhang Xiaozhong's son)—and Li Baozhen, hearing this, tried to exploit the situation by sending his subordinate Jia Lin as a messenger to Wang, urging Wang to return to the imperial fold.  Wang agreed to do so if Emperor Dezong would issue a general pardon to the rebels, but no pardon came at that time.  Still, a secret relationship was created between Li Baozhen and Wang.

In fall 783, after not being given rewards after being summoned to Chang'an in anticipation of further service to the east, the army of Jingyuan Circuit (涇原, headquartered in modern Pingliang, Gansu) rebelled at Chang'an, forcing Emperor Dezong to flee to Fengtian (奉天, in modern Xianyang, Shaanxi).  The Jingyuan army supported Zhu Tao's brother Zhu Ci, then at Chang'an, as emperor of a new state of Qin, and Qin forces subsequently put Emperor Dezong under siege at Fengtian.  When this news reached the armies fighting the rebels in the east, the collective Tang forces in the east scattered, with Ma and Li Qiu returning to their circuits, Li Baozhen taking defensive position at Linming, and Li Huaiguang heading toward Chang'an, hoping to save Emperor Dezong.  Subsequently, when Tian tried to persuade Wang and Zhu Tao's subordinate Ma Shi to attack Li Baozhen's position at Linming with him, Li Baozhen had Jia secretly persuade Wang that such a battle would not be to Wang's benefit—as if Linming fell, it would become part of Weibo territory, while a defeat would damage Hengji's army.  Wang thus declined Tian's invitation and returned to Hengji.  Subsequently, at Jia's further persuasion—pointing out that Zhu Tao's title of Prince of Ji showed an implicit ambition to take Wang's Ji Prefecture (冀州, in modern Hengshui, Hebei) and that Zhu Tao was planning to involve Huige forces and attack south to join with Zhu Ci—Wang made a secret pact with Li Baozhen and Ma Sui to turn against Zhu Tao.  Wang was further able to persuade Tian and LI Na to turn against Zhu Tao as well.  In 784, when Wang, Tian, and Li Na publicly renounced their princely titles, Emperor Dezong, then still at Fengtian although no longer under siege by Zhu Ci, accepted Wang's, Tian's, and LI Na's pledge of allegiance and officially made them military governors again, while honoring Li Baozhen with an honorary chancellor title.  Tian Yue was subsequently assassinated and succeeded by his cousin Tian Xu, who continued to be aligned with imperial forces.  When Zhu Tao and Huige forces subsequently attacked Tian Xu, Li Baozhen and Wang arrived to aid him.  It was said, however, that despite the pact, Li Baozhen's army and Wang's army still viewed each other as enemies due to their long-time rivalry, and the armies suspected each other.  Li Baozhen, in order to show Wang his good faith, took only a few soldiers with him and went into Wang's camp to meet him, further showing his good faith by sleeping there.  Wang, touched by Li Baozhen's display, stated, "My body has been promised to Brother Ten and will die for you."  Together, they defeated Zhu Tao, forcing him to flee back to Lulong and end his campaign to take over the region.  (Zhu Tao subsequently renounced his princely title as well and died shortly thereafter.)  For Li Baozhen's contributions, Emperor Dezong created him the Duke of Ni, and then the Prince of Yiyang.  After the end of the wars, early in Emperor Dezong's Zhenyuan era (785–805), Li Baozhen visited Chang'an to pay homage to Emperor Dezong but returned to Zhaoyi thereafter.  In 787, when Emperor Dezong tried to put him in charge of an operation to regain the western prefectures lost to Tufan, Li Baozhen declined.  (The Song Dynasty historian Sima Guang attributed this to Li Baozhen being displeased that Emperor Dezong had, earlier in the year, relieved Li Sheng of his military command at the suggestion of the chancellor Zhang Yanshang.)

Meanwhile, it was said that Li Baozhen tried to gather talented people to his circuit by sending messengers throughout the realm to look for talented people and entice them with rewards, but that if those people thus retained had few suggestions for him, he would let them leave.  As the realm was peaceful at the time, he constructed many pavilions and artificial lakes for his own amusement.  He also engaged many alchemists in search of immortality.  One of the alchemists that he engaged, Sun Jichang, made golden pills for him and told him that consuming them would lead to immortality.  Li Baozhen trusted Sun—so much so that he commented to his subordinates, "This is something that not even Qin Shi Huang or Emperor Wu of Han was able to have.  I will soon be at the court of Shangdi and no longer be among you."  As he then dreamed of riding on a flying crane, he made a wooden crane and practiced riding on it.  Eventually, Li Baozhen took a total of 20,000 pills, and it was said that his belly became firm and he was unable to eat.  A Taoist monk, Niu Dongxuan, briefly cured him by giving him lard and laxatives.  However, after Li Baozhen was healed, he again listened to Sun, who stated, "You have come close to immortality.  Why abandon it now?"  Li Baozhen thereafter took 3,000 more pills and died.  Emperor Dezong mourned him for three days and gave him posthumous honors.

At the time that Li Baozhen was ill, his son Li Jian plotted with Li Baozhen's subordinate Lu Huichang and nephew Yuan Zhongjing for Li Jian to take over Zhaoyi.  After Li Baozhen's death, Yuan acted as if Li Baozhen were still alive and forged an order from Li Baozhen transferring command to Li Jian.  Initially, Li Baozhen's deputy Li Shuo and other subordinates agreed.  Lu then forged a petition from Li Baozhen requesting Emperor Dezong to allow Li Jian to succeed Li Baozhen.  Emperor Dezong, already hearing rumors that Li Baozhen had died, sent the eunuch Diwu Shoujin to Zhaoyi, ordering that the command be transferred to Li Baozhen's subordinate Wang Yan'gui.  When Li Jian considered resisting, the other officers would not go along with him, and he gave up the command and went to Luoyang per Emperor Dezong's orders.

Notes and references 

 Old Book of Tang, vol. 132.
 New Book of Tang, vol. 138.
 Zizhi Tongjian, vols. 223, 225, 226, 227, 228, 229, 230, 231, 232, 235.

733 births
794 deaths
Tang dynasty jiedushi of Zhaoyi Circuit
Tang dynasty Taoists
Tang dynasty nonimperial princes